Dorstenia excentrica is a plant species in the family Moraceae.

It is endemic to northeastern Mexico, in Tamaulipas state.

References

excentrica
Endemic flora of Mexico
Flora of Tamaulipas
Plants described in 1840